Pomjan ( or )) is a small village in the City Municipality of Koper in the Littoral region of Slovenia.

Church
The parish church in the settlement is dedicated to Saint George.

References

External links

Pomjan on Geopedia

Populated places in the City Municipality of Koper